Reproductive surgery is using surgery in the field of reproductive medicine. It can be used for contraception, e.g. in vasectomy, wherein the vasa deferentia of a man are severed, but is also used plentifully in assisted reproductive technology.

A reproductive surgeon is an obstetrician-gynecologist or urologist who specializes in reproductive surgery.

In assisted reproductive technology
Reproductive surgery is used for treating e.g. fallopian tube obstruction and vas deferens obstruction, or reversing a vasectomy by a reverse vasectomy.

Surgical sperm retrieval is an alternative means of semen collection, where other means are not possible, e.g. in posthumous sperm retrieval.

Trends
Albeit an increase in overall use of assisted reproductive technology (ART), surgeries on the fallopian tubes and ovaries have decreased. Reproductive surgery in women has largely been complementary to other ART methods such as medication, except for in tubal infertility, where surgery remains the main treatment.

References

Assisted reproductive technology
Surgery
Human reproduction